The 2008 ITF Kolkata Open was a professional tennis tournament played on indoor hard courts. It was the fourth edition of the tournament which is part of the 2008 ITF Women's Circuit, offering a total of $50,000 in prize money. It took place in Kolkata, India, on 17–23 November 2008.

Results

Singles 

  Ayumi Morita def.  Elora Dabija, 6–3, 6–1

Doubles 

  Laura Siegemund /  Ágnes Szatmári def.  Lu Jingjing /  Sun Shengnan, 7–5, 6–3

External links 
 2008 ITF Kolkata Open at ITFtennis.com

2008 ITF Women's Circuit
2008 in Indian sport
Sport in Kolkata
Tennis tournaments in India
ITF Women's World Tennis Tour